The Banzerbach is a river of Bavaria, Germany. It is a left tributary of the Swabian Rezat. Its upper course, upstream from its confluence with the Bachwiesengraben, is called Weihergraben. Its middle course, between the confluence with the Bachwiesengraben and the confluence with the Walkerszeller Bach, is called Buxbach. It flows into the Swabian Rezat south of Pleinfeld.

See also
List of rivers of Bavaria

References

Rivers of Bavaria
Weißenburg-Gunzenhausen
Rivers of Germany